This is a list of people associated with Macalester College in Saint Paul, Minnesota, including notable alumni and faculty.

Notable alumni

Academics 
 Laurence BonJour – philosopher at the University of Washington
 Karlyn Kohrs Campbell (1958) – rhetorician, activist
 William P. Gerberding (1951) – President Emeritus, University of Washington
 David C. Hodge (1970) – President, Miami University
 Patricia Ingraham – Professor of Public Administration, Syracuse University
 Michael Jensen – Professor Emeritus, Harvard Business School
 Jane Larson (1980) –  Professor of Law at the University of Wisconsin Law School
 Edward Everett Nourse – Congregational theologian
 Alexander Wendt – social constructivist scholar of international relations

Actors, directors, playwrights
 Peter Berg (1984) – director, actor, and producer
 Jessica Blank – playwright, The Exonerated
 Danai Gurira – actress (The Walking Dead, Black Panther, Avengers: Infinity War, Avengers: Endgame), playwright (Eclipsed)
 Chris Kobin – producer (Hollywood Don't Surf!, Slasher: an IFC Original), writer (2001 Maniacs)
 Carl Lumbly – actor, Men of Honor, Alias
 Chris Wedes (1949) – portrayed the clown J.P. Patches on the Emmy-winning J.P. Patches Show

Artists and architects
 Siah Armajani – Iranian-born American sculptor
 Cass Gilbert – architect, known for United States Supreme Court building, Woolworth Building, and Minnesota State Capitol
 Duane Hanson (1946) – sculptor, known for his photorealistic human figures
 Judith Lodge (born 1941) – painter, photographer
 Anna Min – photographer
 Yuko Nii (1965) – Japanese-American artist
 Colleen Randall (born 1952) – American abstract painter 
 Monica Rudquist  – artist

Business and finance
 Jeremy Allaire – Internet entrepreneur
 J.J. Allaire – Software engineer and internet entrepreneur
 Ari Emanuel – talent agent, basis for the character Ari Gold on HBO's Entourage
 Omar Al Futtaim – Emirati businessman
 Lois Quam – executive who has worked in the public and the private sectors to expand access to health care
 Fred Swaniker – African entrepreneur and educator, co-founder of African Leadership Academy, named one of Time Magazine's 100 most influential people in 2019
 DeWitt Wallace – founder, Reader's Digest magazine (did not graduate)

Musicians
 Bad Bad Hats -- American indie rock band with alumni Kerry Alexander and Chris Hoge
 M.anifest -- Ghanaian rapper, singer, songwriter; winner of Best Rapper and Hip Hop Song of the Year at 2017 Ghana Music Awards
 Gaelynn Lea -- winner of NPR's 2016 Tiny Desk Contest
 Gary Hines -- director of Grammy-winning Sounds of Blackness
 Bob Mould – musician, member of Hüsker Dü
 Will Sheff – singer and guitarist of indie band Okkervil River
 Steve Tibbetts
 Joey Waronker (1993) – drummer, known for his work with Beck, R.E.M. and Walt Mink
Walt Mink – indie rock band named after Macalester professor
 Amanda Warner – aka MNDR

Public servants
 Paul H. Anderson (1965) – Minnesota Supreme Court justice
 Kofi Annan (1961) – Secretary-General of the United Nations (1997–2006), 2001 Nobel Peace Prize winner
 Sharon Sayles Belton (1973) – former mayor of Minneapolis, Minnesota (1994–2001); attorney
 Leland Bush – Judge of the District Court of Minnesota; attorney
 Bobby Joe Champion – Minnesota House member since 2009
 Teresa Daly – Minnesota state politician
 Michael J. Davis (1969) – U.S. District Court judge
 Matt Entenza – former Minnesota House Minority Leader
 Juan Figueroa – foundation president and 2010 Connecticut gubernatorial candidate
 Frank Hornstein (1981) – Minnesota House member since 2003
 B. Todd Jones (1979) – Acting Director of the Bureau of Alcohol, Tobacco, Firearms and Explosives; U.S. Attorney for the District of Minnesota 
 Carlos Mariani – Minnesota House member since 1991
 Scott McCallum – former Governor of Wisconsin (2001–2003)
 Doug McFarland – law professor, Hamline University; Minnesota state politician
 Joan Mondale (1952) – Trustee Emeriti, former Second Lady of the United States
 Walter Mondale (1951) – U.S. Senator (1964–1976); Vice President of the U.S. (1977–1981); 1984 U.S. presidential candidate
 Julianne Ortman (1986) – Minnesota Senate member since 2003
 Rebecca Otto (1985) – Minnesota State Auditor; former Minnesota House member (2003–2004)
 Olli Rehn – European Commissioner for Enterprise and Information Society (2004), Enlargement (2004–2010), and Economic and Financial Affairs (2010–present)
 Leslie Stein – Judge of the New York State Court of Appeals
 Christopher O. Ward (1976) – Executive Director of the Port Authority of New York and New Jersey
 Robert W. Warren (1950) – U.S. District Court judge
 Don I. Wortman (1951) – Acting Commissioner of the Social Security Administration (1977–1978); federal government executive

Religion
Donald M. Hultstrand – Bishop of Springfield

Writers and journalists
 Gary Arndt (1991) – travel photographer
 Charles Baxter (1969) – University of Minnesota professor; author and National Book Award Winner for The Feast of Love
 Eric Dregni - author of travel memoirs and books about Minnesota, Norway, Italy, food and popular culture 
 Leo J. Enright – World Press Institute Fellow; Irish broadcaster
 Mary Karr – bestselling author, The Liars' Club (attended for one year)
 Wade Keller – Pro Wrestling Torch editor
Ismail Khalidi – playwright
 Walter Kirn – author of Up in the Air (attended for his freshman year)
 Corina Knoll – sports writer
 Chris Kobin – motion picture and television writer/producer
 Alex Lemon (2000) – poet; writer; creative writing professor at Texas Christian University
 Tim O'Brien (1968) – bestselling author, The Things They Carried and Going After Cacciato
 Paul Raushenbush – Religious Editor for The Huffington Post
 Mark Strauss – Editor of Bulletin of the Atomic Scientists
 Ursula Vernon – Hugo Award winning author of Digger
 Dave Zirin – Sports Editor for The Nation magazine

Notable faculty 
 Yahya Armajani
 David Bressoud – former President of the Mathematical Association of America; Dewitt Wallace Professor of Mathematics
 Diane Glancy
 Duchess Harris
 Hubert Humphrey – U.S. Senator from Minnesota, U.S. Vice President, U.S. presidential candidate
 Marlon James – Jamaican novelist and winner of the 2015 Man Booker Prize
 Hildegard Binder Johnson - geographer
 Alvin King – composer, professor of music
 Kiarina Kordela
 George Latimer – former Mayor of St. Paul, 1976–1990.
 Harold LeVander – former Minnesota Governor
 William G. Moseley – geographer
 Edward Duffield Neill – founder
 Peter Rachleff
 Kristina Curry Rogers
 Raymond R. Rogers
 Brian C. Rosenberg
 Tracy Silverman – electric violin player
 James Spradley
 Karen J. Warren 
 Harry Waters Jr. – actor, known for Back to the Future and Angels in America
 Jack Weatherford
 James Wright

Presidents of Macalester College

References

 

Macalester College
Macalester College people